Himself is the second studio album from Akinori Nakagawa.

Track listing

External links
Official Discography 
JBOOK DATA 

2004 albums
Akinori Nakagawa albums